USS O'Brien has been the name of five ships of the United States Navy, in honor of Jeremiah O'Brien (1744–1818):

 , a torpedo boat, built in 1900 and served until 1909.
 , an O'Brien-class destroyer, which served from 1915 until 1922.
 , a Sims-class destroyer, served from 1940 until she was sunk by an enemy torpedo in 1942.
 , an Allen M. Sumner-class destroyer, served from 1944 until 1972.
 , a Spruance-class destroyer, launched in 1976 and served until 2004.

See also
 , a Liberty ship, which served during World War II.

United States Navy ship names